Osamu Yatabe ( Yatabe Osamu; 15 February 1932 – 5 December 2021) was a Japanese lawyer and politician. A member of the Japan Socialist Party and later the New Socialist Party of Japan, he served in the House of Councillors from 1974 to 1998.

References

1932 births
2021 deaths
People from Ibaraki Prefecture
Members of the House of Councillors (Japan)
Social Democratic Party (Japan) politicians
New Socialist Party of Japan politicians